The 1915–16 Montreal Canadiens season was the team's seventh season and seventh of the National Hockey Association (NHA). After finishing last in 1914–15, the club rebounded to win the league championship and win the Stanley Cup for the first time.

Regular season
The Canadiens revised their lineup after finishing last. Ernie Dubeau, Jimmy Gardner and Harry Scott retired. The Canadiens added Howard McNamara and Goldie Prodgers on defence. Jack Laviolette moved to forward from defence. Lalonde would have an outstanding season, leading the league in scoring with 31 goals and Georges Vezina would improve his GAA to 3.2, second in the league to Clint Benedict. The team would win all of its last seven games (and eleven of the last twelve) of the season to take the league championship.

Final standings

Schedule and results

Playoffs
The club won the league outright to proceed to the Stanley Cup championship.

Stanley Cup Finals

The series was held in Montreal, it being the turn of the NHA champion to host the series.
The games were held at the Montreal Arena.

References

See also
 1915–16 NHA season
 List of Stanley Cup champions

Montreal Canadiens seasons
Montreal Canadiens season, 1915-16
Stanley Cup championship seasons
Mon